Efigenio is a given name. Notable people with the name include:

 Efigenio Ameijeiras (1931–2020), Cuban military commander
 Efigenio Favier (born 1959), Cuban fencer

See also
 Eugenio

Masculine given names